Bauke Muller (born 17 February 1962) is a Dutch bridge player living in Hoorn.

Muller was World Champion Open Teams (Bermuda Bowl) in 1993 and 2011 and European Champion Open Teams (Tenerife) in 2005. In 2007 he won the bronze medal at both the European Open Team Championships in Antalya and the World Open Teams Championships in Shanghai. He is nicknamed "the professor" because of his habit of very long pauses for thought.

References

External links
 
 
 Netherlands open team at topbridge.nl 

1962 births
Dutch contract bridge players
Bermuda Bowl players
People from Hoorn
Living people
Place of birth missing (living people)
Sportspeople from North Holland